Clemens House may refer to:

in the United States
(by state)
Clemens House (Huntsville, Alabama), listed on the National Register of Historic Places (NRHP)
Clemens House (Biloxi, Mississippi), listed on the NRHP in Harrison County, Mississippi
Clemens House-Columbia Brewery District, St. Louis, Missouri, NRHP-listed
Orion Clemens House, Carson City, Nevada, NRHP-listed
Clemens Ranchhouse, Magdalena, New Mexico, listed on the NRHP in Socorro County, New Mexico
James and Sophia Clemens Farmstead, Palestine, Ohio, NRHP-listed
Michael Clemens House, Grants Pass, Oregon, listed on the NRHP in Josephine County, Oregon